
Gmina Samborzec is a rural gmina (administrative district) in Sandomierz County, Świętokrzyskie Voivodeship, in south-central Poland.

Villages
Gmina Samborzec contains the villages and settlements of Andruszkowice, Bogoria Skotnicka, Bystrojowice, Chobrzany, Faliszowice, Gorzyczany, Jachimowice, Janowice, Kobierniki, Koćmierzów, Krzeczkowice, Łojowice, Milczany, Ostrołęka, Polanów, Ryłowice, Samborzec, Skotniki, Śmiechowice, Strączków, Strochcice, Szewce, Wielogóra, Zajeziorze, Zawierzbie, Zawisełcze and Złota.

Neighbouring gminas
Gmina Samborzec is bordered by the towns of Sandomierz and Tarnobrzeg, and by the gminas of Klimontów, Koprzywnica and Obrazów.

References

Polish official population figures 2006

Samborzec
Sandomierz County